Contemporary Review (现代评论) was a Chinese literary weekly magazine founded in 1924 and ceased December 1928.

Publication history
"Contemporary Review" (现代评论) debuted in Beijing December 13, 1924.  After 209 issues, it ceased in 1928. There were 3 extra issues and a series of specials.  This is a general weekly spanning politics, economics, law, the arts, philosophy, education and science.  Closely affiliated scholars include Hu Shih (胡适), Gao Yihan (高一涵), Tang Youren (唐有壬),  Chen Yuan (陈源), Xu Zimo (徐志摩) and others. Most of them studied in Europe or United States.  "Contemporary Review" valued individualism and freedom of style.  While it was a general magazine, it published a large number of new literature writers introducing them to an eager audience.  Zhang Dinghuang (张定璜) published "Mr. Lu Xun" (鲁迅先生) as a comprehensive two part review of all Lu's writings in the journal, January 24 and 31 issues of 1925.  Zhang's essay defined Lu Xun's historic significance in the transition of modern Chinese literature.

Early Republic of China journals such as "Fiction Monthly" (founded 1910), "Contemporary Review" along with "New Youth (Xin Qingnian)" (founded 1915), "Creative Quarterly" (1921), Tattler (November 1924) and others played a critical role in modernizing the written Chinese language. These intersecting circles of young scholars all witnessed the 1911 Xinhai revolution.  Their goal was to revolutionize the written language, transforming it from the classical to the vernacular.  These talented writers and scholars had close relationships with successive education ministries. They established the education system and the curriculum. (Hu Shih 胡适 for example served as Education Minister for the Republic of China.  Cheng Fangwu 成仿吾 of "Creative Quarterly" set up the Red Army education system for their long march and beyond.)  These journals published the new literature authors.  The reviews (sometimes very heated) gave theoretical foundation for the works.  By the end of the 20th century, the Chinese general population achieved a level of literacy.  This is the lasting revolution.

Representative issues

The Table of Contents give a feel to the magazine.

First Issue Table of Contents 
 Editorial—Current Events
 Government by Law and Revolution, by Yan Shutang
 The Critical Moment, by Wang Shijie
 Generous Settlement Terms for the Qing Imperial Family
 "Beggar", a novella, by Xi Lin
 "November 3rd" a novel, by You Dafu
 "Difficulties of Translation", by Hu Shih
 "Philistines", by Xi Gu

References 

1924 establishments in China
1928 disestablishments in China
Chinese literature
Literary magazines published in China
Chinese poetry
Weekly magazines published in China
Defunct literary magazines
Defunct magazines published in China
Magazines established in 1924
Magazines disestablished in 1928
Poetry literary magazines